Pelinopsis is a monotypic moth genus of the family Crambidae described by Paul Dognin in 1905. Its only species, Pelinopsis pachyzanclodes, described at the same time, is found in Loja Province, Ecuador.

References

Spilomelinae
Crambidae genera
Monotypic moth genera
Taxa named by Paul Dognin